The Derry Central Railway was an Irish gauge railway in County Londonderry, Northern Ireland.

History

The line was authorised by the Derry Central Railway Act, 1877, and constructed from Macfin Junction (between Coleraine and Ballymoney) to Magherafelt, serving Maghera, Upperlands, Kilrea, Garvagh and Aghadowey. Although nominally independent, the line was funded by the Belfast and Northern Counties Railway.

In September 1901 it was taken over by the Northern Counties Committee for the sum of £85,000.

In 1936 there were two trains a day from Belfast to Coleraine via this line and one other train from Magherafelt to Coleraine, consisting of 2 coaches and a 2-4-0 compound engine. The track had flat bottomed rails, followed the contour of the land and the only large structure was a lattice girder bridge over the River Bann near Macfin.

References

Closed railways in Northern Ireland
Transport in County Londonderry
Railway lines opened in 1880
Railway lines closed in 1950
Defunct railway companies of Ireland
Irish gauge railways